Stantari is an archaeological site in Corsica.  It is located in "Cauria", commune of Sartène.

The alignments of Stantari is close to the dolmen of Funtanaccia; in a distance of 300 m in the south are Rinaghju alignments.

Archaeological sites in Corsica